The communauté de communes Le Dunois is located in the Cher  département  of the Centre-Val de Loire region of France. It was created in January 2001. Its seat is Dun-sur-Auron. Its area is 335.7 km2, and its population was 7,507 in 2018.

Composition
The communauté de communes consists of the following 17 communes:

Bannegon
Bussy
Chalivoy-Milon
Cogny
Contres
Dun-sur-Auron
Lantan
Le Pondy
Lugny-Bourbonnais
Osmery
Parnay
Raymond
Saint-Denis-de-Palin
Saint-Germain-des-Bois
Senneçay
Thaumiers
Verneuil

References

DunoisCher
Dunois